Khanpur Ahir or Khanpur Aheer is a village in  Mundawar Mandal in Alwar district in the Indian state of Rajasthan.

Demographics
Khanpur Ahir is a small village located in Mundawar tehsil of Alwar district, Rajasthan, India, with total 367 families residing.

As of 2011 India census, Khanpur Ahir had a population of 1929 in 352 households. Males (1000) constitute 51.6%  of the population and females (929) 48.39%. Khanpur Ahir has an average literacy (1226) rate of 67.96%, less than the national average of 74%: male literacy (729) is 59.46%, and female literacy (497) is 40.53%. In Khanpur Ahir, 10.75% of the population is under 6 years of age (194).

Education

Colleges near Khanpur Ahir 
Govt Collage, Mundawar (Alwar)
Karam Vidhya Mandir Mundawar: Shyopur Circle, Mundawar (Alwar)
Rat Mahila Mahavidyalaya, Mundawar: Alwar
Ratandeep Mahila Mahavidyalaya, Kokawas Sodaws: Mundawar, Alwar

Schools in Khanpur Aheer 
Yadav Pub. Sch. Kahanpur Aheer: khanpur aheer, mundawar, alwar, Rajasthan . PIN- 301403, Post - Harsauli
Aadarsh Govt. Senior Secondary School Khanpur Ahir: khanpur ahir, mundawar, alwar, Rajasthan . PIN- 301403
Government School Khanpur Ahir Alwar, Rajasthan,
Harvest moon public school (CBSE)

Occupations
Education
Defense
Agriculture
Farming
Government Jobs
Corporate legal service
Law Services
Medical Services

People from this village have rendered their services to defence services viz Indian Army, Indian Navy and Indian Air Force as well as police services.

Transportation

Khanpur Ahir is a village in Alwar district in Rajasthan, and also has a railway station. Khanpur Ahir railway station is administrated by North Western Railways from Jaipur, Rajasthan and established in 1952. The nearest main station is at New Delhi, and the nearest airport is Indira Gandhi International Airport.
Gramin bus service many times in a day and Rajasthan roadways service also in the morning and evening

Agriculture

Most of the people of Khanpur Ahir are landlords and farmers.

Khanpur Ahir  main occupation is agriculture. In Kharif season Bajra, Maize, Jowar, Karif pulses, Arhar, Sesamum, Cotton, Guar etc. and in Rabi season Wheat, Barley, Gram, Mustard, Taramira, Rabi pulses etc. The main source of irrigation are wells and tube wells.  Electric motors and diesel pump sets are being used for Irrigation purposes. The normal rainfall for the district is 657.3 mm. The average rainfall in last ten years in the district is 724 mm. The rainfall distribution in the district is uneven and scattered, which resulted sometimes in flood problems and sometimes drought position which affect the agriculture production as well as cropping pattern in Kharif & Rabi season. Thus, the agriculture in the district by and large depends on rainfall distribution. The average rainfall in 2011 up to September is 217 mm.

References

Villages in Alwar district